Tamara Tarasenko (born May 24, 1939, Moscow, Soviet Union — died May 23, 1992, Odessa, Ukraine)
professor, philosopher, the first Chairman of the Board of Dr. Haass Social Assistance Fund (1987).

Graduated with honors from the philological faculty of the Odessa State I. I. Mechnikov University (OSU) in 1961. PhD thesis - "Regulatory Aspects of Social Functioning of the Language” (1974).

Worked as a Russian language and literature teacher, senior librarian at the University Scientific Library, professor at the Department of Philosophy, Head of the Department of Philosophy, Director of the Odessa State University Library.

Head of the Social Assistance Fund 

According to the memoirs of one of the founders of the Dr. Haass Social Assistance Fund, a distinguished lawyer of Ukraine Alexander Muchnik, on November 26, 1987 T. A. Tarasenko was elected the first chairman of the Board of one of the first in the USSR non-governmental charitable organization. Occupying the post of the Head of the Department of Philosophy at the Odessa State University, T.A. Tarasenko played an important role in the official legalization of the charitable organization  under the difficult conditions of the Soviet bureaucracy. As the Head of the Foundation she was personally involved in the direct provision of social assistance to people in need. T.A.Tarasenko laid the tradition in charity management system of moral, dedicated and selfless service to others.

Scientific and teaching activities 

According to numerous memoirs of her colleagues, T.A. Tarasenko was one of the first in the Soviet Union to develop and begin delivering lectures on the History of Russian 20th century philosophy. Thanks to her,  students of the university first got to know the works of Berdyaev, Bulgakov, Ilyin, Lossky, Rozanov, Solovyov, Fedorov, Florensky, Florovsky, Frank, Shestov et al. at that time kept in special depositories. In her lectures and seminars T. A. Tarasenko  practiced the method of the famous Soviet philosopher Genrikh S. Batishchev (1932-1990) - a "deep dialogue", a dialogue that involves not only  mind but also conscience, a moral component of the personality of her students.

In her teaching activities she had a genuine respect to students' dignity, thinking and personal traits of character. She  came to help in need, showing sensitivity to the inner world of a young man.

In 1991, being seriously ill and suffering from pain, she carried on teaching, delivering lectures and seminars. She considered it her duty to complete the course of lectures for the Law faculty students.

Memory 

Died on May 23, 1992, buried in the North Cemetery of Odessa.

The memory  of T. A. Tarasenko was engraved in the book by the Odessa State University professor Gennady P. Grebennik "Intellectual Portrait in Odessa Interior. A Story about Tamara Tarasenko, and not only about her". G. Grebennik wrote:

“She lived next to us, but the secret of her existence was hidden from us. She was the only person I have encountered on my way who practiced a great, now vanished, tradition in Philosophy - the tradition of Socrates. She was a philosopher in the true sense of the word, because her purpose was not to discover  formal scientific laws, but life itself in the harmony of all its aspects. Such is the mystery of her life, revealed to us after her death.”

At the request of the Fund the artist Lazar L. Gormakh (1924-2000) wrote in pastel a portrait of T. A. Tarasenko, displayed in the Fund along with the portraits of Friedrich Joseph Haass and Mother Teresa.

References 

1939 births
1992 deaths
Ukrainian philosophers
Ukrainian philanthropists
Ukrainian human rights activists
Women human rights activists
Writers from Odesa
20th-century philanthropists
20th-century Russian philosophers
Ukrainian women philanthropists
20th-century women philanthropists